Monounsaturated fats are fatty acids that have one double bond in the fatty acid chain with all of the remainder carbon atoms being single-bonded. By contrast, polyunsaturated fats have more than one double bond.

Molecular description
Fatty acids are long-chained molecules having an alkyl group at one end and a carboxylic acid group at the other end. Fatty acid viscosity (thickness) and melting temperature increases with decreasing number of double bonds; therefore, monounsaturated fatty acids have a higher melting point than polyunsaturated fatty acids (more double bonds) and a lower melting point than saturated fatty acids (no double bonds). Monounsaturated fatty acids are liquids at room temperature and semisolid or solid when refrigerated resulting in an isotopic lattice structure.

Common monounsaturated fatty acids are palmitoleic acid (16:1 n−7), cis-vaccenic acid (18:1 n−7) and oleic acid (18:1 n−9). Palmitoleic acid has 16 carbon atoms with the first double bond occurring 7 carbon atoms away from the methyl group (and 9 carbons from the carboxyl end). It can be lengthened to the 18-carbon cis-vaccenic acid. Oleic acid has 18 carbon atoms with the first double bond occurring 9 carbon atoms away from the carboxylic acid group. The illustrations below show a molecule of oleic acid in Lewis formula and as a space-filling model.

List of monounsaturated fats

Health
The large scale KANWU study found that increasing monounsaturated fat and decreasing saturated fat intake could improve insulin sensitivity, but only when the overall fat intake of the diet was low. However, some monounsaturated fatty acids (in the same way as saturated fats) may promote insulin resistance, whereas polyunsaturated fatty acids may be protective against insulin resistance.
Studies have shown that substituting dietary monounsaturated fat for saturated fat is associated with increased daily physical activity and resting energy expenditure. More physical activity was associated with a higher-oleic acid diet than one of a palmitic acid diet. From the study, it is shown that more monounsaturated fats lead to less anger and irritability.

Foods containing monounsaturated fats reduce low-density lipoprotein (LDL) cholesterol, while possibly increasing high-density lipoprotein (HDL) cholesterol.

Levels of oleic acid along with other monounsaturated fatty acids in red blood cell membranes were positively associated with breast cancer risk. The saturation index (SI) of the same membranes was inversely associated with breast cancer risk. Monounsaturated fats and low SI in erythrocyte membranes are predictors of postmenopausal breast cancer. Both of these variables depend on the activity of the enzyme delta-9 desaturase (Δ9-d).

In children, consumption of monounsaturated oils is associated with healthier serum lipid profiles.

The Mediterranean diet is one heavily influenced by monounsaturated fats. People in Mediterranean countries consume more total fat than Northern European countries, but most of the fat is in the form of monounsaturated fatty acids from olive oil and omega-3 fatty acids from fish, vegetables, and certain meats like lamb, while consumption of saturated fat is minimal in comparison.
A 2017 review found evidence that the practice of a Mediterranean diet could lead to a decreased risk of cardiovascular diseases, overall cancer incidence, neurodegenerative diseases, diabetes, and early death. A 2018 review showed that the practice of the Mediterranean diet may improve overall health status, such as reduced risk of non-communicable diseases. It also may reduce the social and economic costs of diet-related illnesses.

Sources 

Monounsaturated fats are found in animal flesh such as red meat, whole milk products, nuts, and high fat fruits such as olives and avocados. Algal oil is about 92% monounsaturated fat. Olive oil is about 75% monounsaturated fat. The high oleic variety sunflower oil contains at least 70% monounsaturated fat. Canola oil and cashews are both about 58% monounsaturated fat. Tallow (beef fat) is about 50% monounsaturated fat. and lard is about 40% monounsaturated fat. Other sources include hazelnut, avocado oil, macadamia nut oil, grapeseed oil, groundnut oil (peanut oil), sesame oil, corn oil, popcorn, whole grain wheat, cereal, oatmeal, almond oil, sunflower oil, hemp oil, and tea-oil Camellia.

See also 
 High density lipoprotein
 Fatty acid synthesis

References

External links 
 Fats (Mayo Clinic)
 The Chemistry of Unsaturated Fats

Food science

Lipids
Nutrition

de:Fettsäuren#Gesättigte und ungesättigte Fettsäuren